Irina Vasilyevna Stankina (born 25 March 1977 in Saransk, Mordovian ASSR, Soviet Union) is a Russian race walker. The 1994 World Junior champion and record holder, in 1995 she won the 10 kilometres race walk at the World Championships as the youngest-ever (18 years and 135 days). She later walked the 20 kilometres race walk in 1:25:29 hours, the fourth-best time ever.

International competitions

References

1977 births
Living people
People from Saransk
Sportspeople from Mordovia
Russian female racewalkers
Olympic female racewalkers
Olympic athletes of Russia
Athletes (track and field) at the 1996 Summer Olympics
Athletes (track and field) at the 2000 Summer Olympics
World Athletics Championships athletes for Russia
World Athletics Championships winners
World Athletics Championships medalists
World Athletics Race Walking Team Championships winners
World Athletics U20 Championships winners
Russian Athletics Championships winners
20th-century Russian women